Brokke is a village in Valle municipality in Agder county, Norway. The Brokke Alpine Ski Centre is located just west of the village.

References

Villages in Agder
Valle, Norway